Vanni Emanuele Treves CBE (1940 – 10 November 2019) was a British business executive. He was Chairman of Channel 4 (1998–2003), a senior partner of City law firm Macfarlanes, and Chairman (2001–2009) of Equitable Life.

Early life and education
Treves was born in Florence, Italy in 1940.  His father was killed during the Second World War in 1944 and his mother remarried, after which the family relocated to Swiss Cottage in London. He won a scholarship to the independent St Paul's School, London, before attending the University of Oxford to study jurisprudence. Treves later completed a Fulbright scholarship in the United States at the University of Illinois. He relinquished his dual Italian-British nationality at the age of 36 when he realised that it made him eligible for national service in the Italian Army.

Career
Following his graduation from Oxford, Treves joined Macfarlanes in 1963 and went on to become a specialist in corporate governance. It was this that led to his appointment as a non-executive director of Saatchi & Saatchi in 1987. During the 1990s he went on to develop a career, as Philip Inman puts it, as a "serial chairman." In 2001 he took up the chairmanship of Equitable Life, determined to resolve its troubles.

Treves was appointed Commander of the Order of the British Empire (CBE) in the 2012 New Year Honours for services to education (as chair of the National College for School Leadership).

Personal life
Treves was married with two sons and a daughter. He was a donor to the Labour Party.

He authored "What life after retirement from the law?," which was published in The Times on 4 April 2013.

References

External links

1940 births
2019 deaths
Alumni of University College, Oxford
British solicitors
British television executives
Commanders of the Order of the British Empire
Italian emigrants to the United Kingdom
National Society for the Prevention of Cruelty to Children people
People educated at St Paul's School, London
University of Illinois Urbana-Champaign alumni
Chairmen of Channel 4
Businesspeople from Florence